Roweia is a genus of echinoderms belonging to the family Cucumariidae.

The species of this genus are found in Southern Africa and Southeastern Asia.

Species:

Roweia frauenfeldi 
Roweia stephensoni

References

Cucumariidae
Holothuroidea genera